Takaya Miou (Takaya Miō) is a Japanese manga artist born in Nagoya, Japan.  Her career began in 1991, with the self-publication of Sei Shojo Yugi.  Her art blends surrealism, eroticism, fantasy, horror, as seen in the image of an almost nude disemboweled young man.  She had her first solo gallery exhibition in 2016 at the Honolulu Museum of Art under the title, Visions of Gothic Angels: Japanese Manga by Takaya Miou.<ref>Salel, Stephen, "Visions of Gothic Angels: Japanese Manga by Takaya Miou", Honolulu Museum of Art, June–July-Aug 2016, pp. 4-5</ref>  Her publications include:

 Endorphins, the Substance of Pleasure (決楽物質エンドルフィン), 1993 
 King of Mechanics (機械仕掛けの王様, Rex ex machina), 1993
 The Great Frog Michael (御蛙), 1994 
 Her, 1995 
 Ribs of the Sky (空の肋骨), 1997 
 The Mathematical Structure of Beautiful Faces (美貌方程式), 1997 
 Holy Boys and Other Flightless Angels (無翼天使類聖少年科), 1998 
 The Fountain of Death (死の泉), 1998 
 Eroticize Intelligence, 1999 
 Map of Sacred Pain (聖慯図), 2001 
 The Madness of Heaven (天国狂), 2001 
 Uranomania, 2003 
 Demon Child in Hell (魔童地獄編), 2003 
 Troubled Lord (欠けた王様), 2003 
 Rosette, 2004 
 Child Recipe Book, 2004 
 A Billion Cubes of the Species (体種十億立方体), 2005 
 Gabriel and Beelzebub (ガブリエルと蠅の王), 2006 
 From Off My Bones, 2007 
 The Lunacy Act (月狂条列), 2007 
 Endorphins, the Substance of Pleasure, Vol. 1 (決楽物質エンドルフィン), 2014 
 Rose Crown (薔薇ノ冠), 2014 
 Endorphins, the Substance of Pleasure, Vol. 2 (決楽物質エンドルフィン), 2015 
 Alexithymia'' (アレキシサイミア), 2015

External links
 The artist's website
 Honolulu Museum of Art
 Artist Feature on MEDIUM by Echotokki

Footnotes

Manga artists
Living people
Year of birth missing (living people)